Uberti is a surname. Notable people with the surname include:

 Bernard degli Uberti (1060–1133), Italian Roman Catholic prelate 
 Claudio Uberti (born 1957), Argentinian government official
 Daniel Uberti (born 1963), Uruguayan footballer
 Farinata degli Uberti (1212–1264), Italian aristocrat
 Francesco Uberti (born 1962), Italian sprint canoer
 John Uberti, American military officer
 Pietro Uberti (1671–1762), Italian painter

See also
 A. Uberti, Srl., firearm manufacturer

Italian-language surnames